North Hessary Tor is a 517 metres hill just above Dartmoor Prison, in Princetown within Dartmoor Forest civil parish, which is in the borough of West Devon, Devon, England. The tor is one of the boundary points mentioned in the perambulations of the Forest of Dartmoor.

It was built by the BBC in 1955 when a transmitter was needed to introduce 405-line television into Devon. It now carries a small UHF TV transmitter which serves Princetown and Dartmoor. FM radio transmissions began in 1956 and cover most of Devon and eastern parts of Cornwall.

References

Dartmoor
Tors of Dartmoor